Luigi Landriscina, better known for his stage name Luis Landriscina (born 19 December 1935 in Colonia Baranda, Chaco Province, Argentina) is an Argentine humorist and actor.

He is famous for his humorous stories full of folklore and popular culture. He also made famous the character of "Don Verídico", authored by the Uruguayan Julio César Castro "Juceca".

Discography 
 ???? - Mateando con Landriscina - PHILIPS
 ???? - Landriscina por Landriscina - PHILIPS
 ???? - El humor de mi país - PHILIPS
 1973 - Contata Criolla (Opas 22 y Yo 23) - PHILIPS
 1974 - Landriscina actúa para usted - PHILIPS
 1974 - Regular, pero sincero - PHILIPS
 1974 - Contata Criolla - Concierto para sonreír (Segundo movimiento) - PHILIPS
 1975 -  - PHILIPS
 1975 - Contata Criolla - Concierto con gente y todo (Tercer movimiento) - PHILIPS
 1976 - Contata Criolla - Concierto en Solo de Mate Amargo (Quinto movimiento) - PHILIPS
 1976 - Contata de dos orillas - PHILIPS
 1978 - Fiesta Argentina - Los Campeones (Junto a Gigo Arangio) - PHILIPS
 1978 - Contata para las Fiestas - PHILIPS
 1979 - De entrecasa (Junto a Los 4 de Córdoba) - PHILIPS
 1981 - Mano a mano con el país - Philips
 1982 - Mano a mano con el país Vol. 2 - PHILIPS
 1982 - A reírse de lo lindo con Luis Landriscina - MERCURIO
 1983 - Mano a mano con el país Vol. 3
 1984 - Mano a mano con el país Vol. 4
 1985 - Mano a mano con el país Vol. 5
 1986 - Landriscina en los festivales
 1987 - Aquí me pongo a contar - POLYGRAM DISCOS S.A.
 1987 - Lo que sobra no se tira - PHILIPS
 1989 - Poesías - PHILIPS
 1989 - Bodas de plata con el humor - PHILIPS
 1990 - Es mundial - POLYGRAM DISCOS S.A.
 1993 - El candidato para sonreír
 1992 - Contador Público Nacional
 1994 - 30 años de sonrisas - POLYGRAM DISCOS S.A.
 1995 - Venga, y le cuento - POLYGRAM DISCOS S.A.
 1996 - Campeón del humor - POLYGRAM DISCOS S.A.
 1997 - Luis Landriscina - Antonio Tarragó Ros CD Nro. 1 - EDITORIAL ATLÁNTIDA S.A.
 1999 - Contando cuentos - UNIVERSAL
 1999 - Luis Landriscina Cuenta la Ley Federal de Educación - MINISTERIO DE CULTURA Y EDUCACIÓN DE LA NACIÓN
 2000 - Muchos kilómetros de humor - UNIVERSAL
 2003 - El chiste no es cuento - POL
 2008 - Colour Collection - UNIVERSAL

Filmography 
 Joven, viuda y estanciera (1970)
 El casamiento de Laucha (1977)
 Millonarios a la fuerza (1979)

Bibliography

References

External links

1935 births
Living people
Argentine male actors
Argentine humorists